The Lego Group is a Danish toy-industry company that has produced many products based on original and licensed properties. The following is a list of products that were unproduced or unreleased cancelled media.

Sets

2001

Lego Bionicle

8549: Sand Tarakava
Originally in the 8549: Tarakava set from the summer of 2001, a yellow Tarakava was supposed to have been included with the teal one, but was replaced with the blue instead. The original set costed $30.00 dollars, however five copies of the prototype exist and were purchased by Lego collectors, and a rare yellow noble Ruru was also included.

2021

Lego City

60278: Crook's Hideout Raid
In 2021, a Lego City set was leaked in an advertisement from a Lego Friends instruction manual, depicting a brick building with features such as a brick-built dynamite stick prop on the top of it, as well as a cartoonish bomb print with an exaggerated facial expression to the left side. The building is assumed to be depicting a dynamite factory, with crook minifigures being seen robbing it, and a police helicopter also being included seen hovering over it.

On March 23, 2021, it was confirmed by the fan blog Brick Fanatics that after reaching out to The Lego Group for a comment, Lego had confirmed to them they had decided to cancel plans to release the set, clarifying that it went against their brand values and had also provided this statement on behalf of their decision:

Video games

2002

Lego Bionicle: The Legend of Mata Nui
Sometime in early 2001, The Lego Group hired the video game development company Saffire to create a game centered around the original 2001 storyline of the Bionicle toyline, involving the Toa Mata as they fight off against Makuta's swarms of evil Rahi that threat the island of Mata Nui. The game would have each individual Toa go onto their perspective region and fight off against the enemies relating to the level. After beating the level, the Toa would progress onto the next level and would be given a new Kanohi mask to help them along on their journey. Towards the end of the level, the Toa would then have to face off against their perspective elemental monster based on their element. The game was originally meant to be released in 2001, but was pushed back to another year to 2002, before ultimately being cancelled. In 2001, the PC port was planned for release, as well as the possibility of a GameCube port early the following year before being scrapped altogether. The gameplay has been described as being in a similar style to that of The Legend of Zelda series, specifically the Ocarina of Time and Majora’s Mask entries of the series.

The game was also planned to have included the original orange Kanohi Mask of Time, but due to the games' cancellation, was instead released as a promotional polybag in select Walgreens stores.

2012

Roblox - Lego Star Wars: The Clone Wars event

Following the sponsored Lego Hero Factory: Breakout event, the Roblox Corporation and The Lego Group originally had a deal to release another Lego-tie in event later that same year, however this time, to promote the Lego Star Wars: The Clone Wars line of sets from 2012, that were directly based on the 2008 CGI-animated series with the same name.

The planned event never came to fruition and was ultimately cancelled, and went unnoticed until a year later in 2013, when a user made a discovery that would lead to a search for more of the assets from the event. The event was planned to have some items in the Catalog (currently known as the Avatar Shop) on the Roblox website, and was also going to have prizes (as in virtual avatar accessories) that could have been awarded by completing various tasks by getting the custom game's respective badges attached to such.

The first discovery was made in 2013 when a user noticed that a gear known as the Red Futurion Blaster mistakenly had the Lego Star Wars Storm Trooper Scope set as the icon for the gear that had shown up in game. Shortly afterwards, the files for the Lego Star Wars Jedi Lightsaber were also found on the website.

In September 2019, a different user had found another discovery, this time being images of the 3D models of the Lego Darth Vader and Lego Clone Trooper minifigure character rigs, which were made publicly available via Stephen Jobe's website portfolio, who is a freelance artist who has worked on several successful games and was known as the lead 3D-modeler on the platform until he stepped down in 2013. When this info resurfaced, some interest was made to continue the search. Lastly, some icons and the animations were found from the previous two scrapped gears by the same user who had returned in his search efforts and had made the previous original discoveries back in 2013.

Ultimately, when the user returned to the search efforts, they found no new updates had been provided since. Unlike the two weapons, it is presumed that the character models' files were never uploaded directly onto the Roblox website, as the meshes and textures that were scanned through a privately-funded system that was set up by the user had been scanned to make sure that the accounts held by Roblox that stored the assets from their previous sponsored events at the time would be able to come up with the assets, however instead it came up with the results of the character models having been found nowhere in their database.

Movies

2010

Untitled Bionicle: The Legend Reborn sequel
In 2009, Universal Home Entertainment released a CGI-animated direct-to-video film, titled Bionicle: The Legend Reborn.

Not much info has been revealed about the sequel, however a general idea of the film's plot through the first draft was posted on the unofficial Bionicle community site BZPower in a blog post by Greg Farshtey (who went under the name GregF on fan-sites), the story writer for the series.

2012

Untitled live-action Hero Factory film

In 2012, The Hollywood Reporter reported that Universal were trying to sign a deal with The Lego Group to acquire the film rights for a live-action film based on the Hero Factory toyline. Michael Finch and Alex Litvak were said to have wrote the film, while Mark Gordon and Bryan Zuriff of The Mark Gordon Company were set to produce alongside Ben Forkner and Dean Schnider of Film 360.

2022

Lego Superfriends
The Lego Batman Movie's director, Chris McKay, had confirmed that a sequel was initially in the works, with him keeping the same position prior and also as the director for the sequel.

Plans were to have the movie be released in December 2022, however this release date was dropped, alongside the entirety of the production on the sequel due to Universal Pictures acquiring the film rights to produce full length Lego movies.

References

Lego
Lists of toys